Upper Merion Township is a township in Montgomery County, Pennsylvania. The population was 28,395 at the 2010 U.S. Census. Located  from Philadelphia, it consists of the villages of Gulph Mills, King of Prussia, Swedeland, Swedesburg, and portions of Radnor, and Wayne.

The westernmost part of the township comprises the largest part of the  Valley Forge National Historical Park. The township is the home of the King of Prussia mall. King of Prussia also contains a major office park hosting firms such as Lockheed Martin and GlaxoSmithKline.

The name Merion originates with the county of Merioneth in north Wales. Merioneth is an English-language translation of the Welsh Meirionnydd, itself named after Meirchion (or Meirion), grandson of Cunedda Wledig (b. ca. 380 A.D.), King of North Wales.

History
The township's incorporation dates to 1713 when the King of Prussia Inn, the Bird-In-Hand Inn in Gulph Mills, and later the Swedes Ford Inn were required to pay 6 shillings to the Pennsylvania legislature for licenses.  The King of Prussia Inn, built in 1719, captures the historical flavor of the township.  It was named in honor of Frederick the Great, but became known during the Revolutionary War as a center of food and drink.  An alternate story says the Inn, first called Berry's Tavern, got its name to lure in Prussian mercenaries who spent freely.

Upper Merion Township is a township of the second class under Pennsylvania state statutes. A five-member Board of Supervisors, elected at large for staggered six-year terms, governs it.  The Board passes legislation and sets overall policy for the Township. A professional township manager runs the day-to-day operations overseeing the activities of 250 full and part-time employees.

Hanging Rock and Poplar Lane are listed on the National Register of Historic Places.

Geography
According to the U.S. Census Bureau, the township has a total area of 17.2 square miles (44.7 km2), of which 16.9 square miles (43.7 km2)  is land and 0.4 square mile (1.0 km2) (2.20%) is water. Upper Merion has a hot-summer humid continental climate (Dfa) and the hardiness zone is 7a. It is drained by the Schuylkill River which forms its natural northern and eastern boundary.

Notable sights
 
Upper Merion Township is home to Valley Forge National Historical Park, which consists of the site where General George Washington and the Continental Army made their encampment at Valley Forge during the winter of 1777–78 in the American Revolutionary War. King of Prussia, which is the third largest mall in the United States in terms of leasable space with over 450 stores, is located in Upper Merion Township. Other points of interest in Upper Merion Township include the Valley Forge Casino Resort, the King of Prussia Town Center and the King of Prussia Volunteer Fire Company 9/11 Memorial.

Old Swedes Church (Christ Church) was dedicated June 25, 1760 in Swedesburg, replacing  a simple log cabin dating to 1735. The original church had served as both a church and school until Christ Church was built. The stained glass windows tell the story of the history of the Swedish colony of New Sweden.

After crossing the Schuylkill River at Swedesford on December 13, 1777, General George Washington and his troops visited Old Swedes Church and encamped there before going on to Valley Forge.

Demographics

As of the 2010 census, the township was 76.0% White, 5.5% Black or African American, 0.2% Native American, 14.7% Asian, and 2.1% were two or more races. 3.9% of the population were of Hispanic or Latino ancestry .

As of the 2000 census, there were 26,863 people, 11,575 households, and 7,141 families residing in the township.  The population density was 1,593.3 people per square mile (615.2/km2).  There were 12,151 housing units at an average density of 720.7/sq mi (278.3/km2).  The racial makeup of the township was 84.75% White, 4.63% African American, 0.13% Native American, 8.45% Asian, 0.05% Pacific Islander, 0.66% from other races, and 1.32% from two or more races. Hispanic or Latino of any race were 1.79% of the population.

There were 11,575 households, out of which 23.1% had children under the age of 18 living with them, 52.3% were married couples living together, 6.8% had a female householder with no husband present, and 38.3% were non-families. 29.7% of all households were made up of individuals, and 7.7% had someone living alone who was 65 years of age or older.  The average household size was 2.30 and the average family size was 2.91.

In the township, the population was spread out, with 18.7% under the age of 18, 7.5% from 18 to 24, 33.8% from 25 to 44, 24.3% from 45 to 64, and 15.7% who were 65 years of age or older.  The median age was 38 years. For every 100 females, there were 97.0 males.  For every 100 females age 18 and over, there were 94.9 males.

The median income for a household in the township was $65,636, and the median income for a family was $78,690. Males had a median income of $51,247 versus $38,166 for females. The per capita income for the township was $34,961.  About 1.3% of families and 2.9% of the population were below the poverty line, including 1.6% of those under age 18 and 3.1% of those age 65 or over.

Government and politics

Upper Merion Township is run by an elected five person Board of Supervisors, each of whom serve staggered six year terms. The current supervisors are Chairperson Carole Kenney (D), Vice Chairperson Tina Garzillo (D), Greg Waks (D), Greg Philips (D) and Bill Jenaway (D).  Other than Garzillo, who was appointed in June 2018 to finish the term of Erika Spott (D), there has not been a change in the composition of the Board of Supervisors since January 2012 and each of the current Supervisors (other than Garzillo) was re-elected by a significantly greater margin than originally elected. The Chairperson and Vice Chairperson are elected every year in January by their fellow Supervisors.

The recent Chairs of the Upper Merion Township Board of Supervisors:
2022: Carole Kenney;
2021: Bill Jenaway;
2020: Bill Jenaway;
2019: Greg Waks;
2018: Greg Philips;
2017: Bill Jenaway;
2016: Bill Jenaway;
2015: Greg Philips (from January–April); Erika Spott (from May–December);
2014: Greg Waks;
2013: Greg Waks;
2012: Erika Spott;
2011: Ed McBride (R);
2010: Joe Bartlett (R);
2009: Scott Sibley (R);
2008: Scott Sibley (R)

Municipal general election results from 2001–Present:

All township business meetings are televised by Upper Merion Government Access Television (UMGA-TV). The elected Tax Collector is Evelyn Ankers (D). The elected Board of Auditors are Rhonda Cohen (D), Steve Ciavarri (D) and Kevin Snow (D). The Supervisors hire a township manager to run the operations of the township. The township manager is Anthony Hamaday. 

The township is part of the Fourth Congressional District (represented by Rep. Madeleine Dean-D), the 149th State House District (represented by Rep. Tim Briggs-D) and the 17th State Senate District (represented by Sen. Amanda Cappelletti-D).

Economy

Top employers
According to Upper Merion Township's 2010 Comprehensive Annual Financial Report, the top employers in the township are:

Education 
Public school students in Upper Merion Township attend schools in the Upper Merion Area School District.
 Upper Merion Area High School (grades 9-12)
 Upper Merion Area Middle School (grades 5-8)
 Bridgeport Elementary School (grades K-4)
 Caley Road Elementary School (grades K-4)
 Candlebrook Elementary School (grades K-4)
 Gulph Elementary School (grades K-4)
 Roberts Elementary School (grades K-4)

Upper Merion Township also has a private school, Mother Teresa Regional Catholic School. It formed in 2012 by the merger of Mother of Divine Providence in King of Prussia and St. Teresa of Avila in Norristown.

Armenian Sisters Academy, an Armenian school, is in Upper Merion Township, with a Radnor postal address.

The Roman Catholic Archdiocese of Philadelphia previously maintained Holy Trinity Elementary School, which had a lower school in Swedesburg and an upper school in Bridgeport. It served as the parish school for Our Lady of Mount Carmel, Saint Augustine, and Sacred Heart churches. The first two churches are in Bridgeport and previously had a joint St. Augustine-Our Lady of Mount Carmel School. Sacred Heart is a Polish church in Swedesburg. 102 children were scheduled to attend in September 2005. Instead it closed in June 2005.

Colleges and universities
The Penn State Great Valley campus was once located in the King of Prussia section of Upper Merion from 1963 to 1974 before relocating to Great Valley.  In 1982, the college opened up a new facility called Penn State King of Prussia Center.

Transportation

Upper Merion Township is the location of several major highway junctions serving the Philadelphia metropolitan area. The most prominent of these is the interchange of the Pennsylvania Turnpike (I-276) and the Schuylkill Expressway (I-76). The east-west Pennsylvania Turnpike (I-276) traverses the central portion of the township on a southwest-northeast alignment. The Schuylkill Expressway (I-76) junctions with the turnpike at the west edge of the township and heads southeastward across the southern portion of the township, while also having another major highway junction with U.S. Route 202. The latter traverses the township almost parallel to the turnpike, but does veer north further east and crosses the turnpike without an interchange. Aside from its interchange with the Schuylkill, US 202 also interchanges with the eastern terminus of U.S. Route 422 near the west edge of the township. In addition to these major highways, Pennsylvania Route 23 and Pennsylvania Route 320 traverse Upper Merion Township from east to west and north to south respectively, with PA 320 having its northern terminus at PA 23 in the township. Finally, the northernmost segment of Pennsylvania Route 252 enters the far western edge of the township near its terminus at PA 23.

SEPTA also operates the Norristown High Speed Line between 69th Street Transportation Center and Norristown Transportation Center through Upper Merion Township with stops located at Gulph Mills and Hughes Park. The Greater Valley Forge Transportation Management Association operates The Rambler as a community shuttle around Upper Merion Township Monday through Saturday, serving residential areas, shopping centers, the King of Prussia mall, medical facilities, the Upper Merion Senior Center, and the Upper Merion Township Municipal Building.

See also 

 King of Prussia, Pennsylvania

References

External links

 Upper Merion Township official website

 
Townships in Montgomery County, Pennsylvania
Townships in Pennsylvania